Alina Danelle Mansur (born 26 September 1991) is an Aruban model and beauty pageant titleholder who was crowned Miss Aruba 2017 and represented her country at Miss Universe 2017.

Early life
Mansur was born in Malmok, Aruba on 26 September 1991. She is a Management and Business Administration graduate from Florida International University in Miami, Florida.

Pageantry

Miss Aruba 2017
Mansur participated in the Miss Aruba 2017 pageant, where she was crowned as Miss Universe Aruba 2017. She succeeded outgoing Miss Aruba 2016 Charlene Leslie.

Miss Universe 2017
Mansur will represent Aruba at Miss Universe 2017 where she was defeated by Demi-Leigh Nel-Peters of South Africa in the 2017 Miss Universe beauty pageants.

References

External links

Living people
1991 births
Aruban beauty pageant winners
Aruban female models
Florida International University people
People from Noord
Miss Universe 2017 contestants